Subo, or SuBo, may refer to:

An embroidered Bojagi, a traditional Korean wrapping cloth
An album track on The Weavers at Carnegie Hall Vol. 2, by The Weavers
SuBo, nickname of Scottish singer Susan Boyle